Toonami was a Southeast Asian television channel that was launched on 1 December 2012. It was operated and distributed in Asia by Turner Broadcasting System Asia Pacific, Inc., a subsidiary of Warner Bros. Discovery. It was named after the programming block seen in the U.S, using the logo introduced in 2004 but with different branded promos.

The channel ceased operations on 31 March 2018, after which the channel space created in 2005 by the original version of Boomerang ceased to exist.

Programming
 The Avengers: Earth's Mightiest Heroes
 Batman: The Brave and the Bold
 Beast Saga
 Ben 10
 Ben 10 Alien Force
 Ben 10: Ultimate Alien
 Ben 10: Omniverse
 Beware the Batman
 BeyWarriors: BeyRaiderz
 BeyWarriors: Cyborg
 BeyWheelz
 Blue Dragon
 Deltora Quest
 Dragon Ball Z
 Dragon Ball Super
 Exchange Student Zero
 Gaist Crusher
 Generator Rex
 Green Lantern: The Animated Series
 Hot Wheels Battle Force 5
 Inazuma Eleven
 Inazuma Eleven Go
 Inazuma Eleven Go Galaxy
 Iron Man: Armored Adventures
 Justice League Action
 Justice League Unlimited
 Max Steel
 Metal Fight Beyblade
 Metal Fight Beyblade Zero-G
 Mix Master: Final Force
 The Secret Saturdays
 Sonic Boom
 Star Wars: The Clone Wars
 Superman: The Animated Series
 Sym-Bionic Titan
 Teen Titans
 ThunderCats (2011 TV series)
 Transformers: Prime
 Transformers: Robots in Disguise (2015 TV series)
 Wakfu
 Wolverine and the X-Men
 Xiaolin Chronicles
 Yo-kai Watch
 Young Justice

References

Children's television channels in the Asia Pacific
Defunct television channels
Television programming blocks in Asia
Toonami
Anime television
English-language television stations
Television channels and stations established in 2012
Television channels and stations disestablished in 2018